Liano is a surname. Notable people with the surname include:

Bettina Liano (born 1966), Italian-Australian fashion designer
Gina Liano (born 1966), Italian-Australian barrister and television personality

See also
Liaño (disambiguation)
Lianos (disambiguation)
Llano (disambiguation)